Vibra São Paulo (formerly known as Credicard Hall) is a music theatre in the Santo Amaro neighbourhood, city of São Paulo, Brazil. It opened in September 1999, with capacity for 7,000 people. Considered to be one of the largest indoor entertainment venues in Brazil and one of the largest in Latin America. The 60th anniversary of Miss Universe 2011 pageant was held on September 12 that year at the hall. It used to be called Credicard Hall in most of its history, but its name changed in October 2019 due to a naming rights partner. The theatre closed on March 31, 2021. On 1 April 2022, the reopening of the venue was announced under its new name Vibra São Paulo following an agreement between the new house manager, Opus Entertenimento, and the biofuel company Vibra Energia. The venue officially reopened in May.

Naming history
Credicard Hall (January 2000-20 November 2013; April 2018-October 2019)
Citibank Hall (21 November 2013-April 2018)
UnimedHall (October 2019-March 2021)
Vibra São Paulo (April 2022-)

Performers

See also
KM de Vantagens Hall – a similar venue managed by Time for Fun

External links
Venue Information

References

Indoor arenas in Brazil
Concert halls in Brazil
Music venues completed in 1999
Buildings and structures in São Paulo
Tourist attractions in São Paulo
1999 establishments in Brazil
2021 disestablishments in Brazil